Ben Steven May (born 10 March 1984) is an English former professional footballer who played as a striker. He is the fitness coach for Bromley.

May began his career at Southampton's youth academy in 1998, before playing at Fulham's centre of excellence for a year. In 2000, he joined Millwall's youth set-up. Ahead of the 2002–03 season, May signed his first professional contract with the club, making his debut in August 2002. He was loaned out to Brentford, and then Colchester United, during his six-year tenure at Millwall. In September 2007, May joined Scunthorpe United on a three-month loan agreement, which was made permanent in January 2008. His time at Scunthorpe was plagued with injuries, and he was subsequently released in May 2010.

May signed for Stevenage on a free transfer in October 2010, and was part of the squad that earned promotion to League One during the 2010–11 season. May joined League Two club Barnet on loan. He was released by Stevenage in May 2012, and subsequently signed for Dover Athletic ahead of the 2012–13 season. After a season at Dover, May then joined Ebbsfleet United in June 2013 where spent two years. He signed for Bromley in January 2015 and spent a year-and-a-half playing there before becoming the club's fitness coach.

Early life
May was born in Gravesend, Kent. He attended Leigh CTC School in Dartford. May states that his favourite footballers when growing up were Alan Shearer and Ian Wright as he believed they were "great goalscorers and always entertaining".

Club career

Millwall
May started his career at Southampton's youth academy in 1998, and went on to play at Fulham's centre of excellence for one season. In 2000, at the age of 16, May moved to Millwall, progressing through the youth system and onto the periphery of the first-team. He made his debut for Millwall at the start of the 2002–03 season, coming on as a 62nd-minute substitute in Millwall's 0–0 draw away at Watford on 13 August 2002. Four days later, May started his first match for Millwall, playing 68 minutes in Millwall's 1–0 away loss at Gillingham. He scored his first goal in the club's following match against Ipswich Town, scoring after four minutes to give Millwall the lead in a game that ended 1–1 – the club's website reported that "May was perfectly placed to stab home from close-range after Neil Harris worked well to carve out an opening". He joined Colchester United on loan on 27 March 2003, with the agreement running until the end of the season. He made his Colchester debut two days after signing for the club, playing the whole match as Colchester secured a 1–0 victory over Swindon Town. May made five further appearances for Colchester, before returning to Millwall in May 2003.

May did not play for Millwall at the start of the 2003–04 season, and was loaned out once more, this time to Brentford on 25 August 2003. He joined the club on an initial three-month loan deal. He made his debut in Brentford's 2–1 home victory against Oldham Athletic, playing the whole match. May scored his first goal for Brentford two weeks later, on 6 September 2003, in a 3–1 loss against Plymouth Argyle, scoring the goal that briefly tied the game at 1–1. He received the first red card of his career when he was sent-off for violent conduct in a Football League Trophy match against Barnet on 14 October 2003. May's loan deal was extended until the end of the 2003–04 season on 27 November 2003. Millwall manager Dennis Wise stated "He will do very well under Brentford manager Wally Downes and will learn a lot under him. I didn't feel he was quite ready for our first-team just yet". He scored seven goals in 43 appearances as Brentford finished the season in 17th place. He returned to his parent club on 13 May 2004.

Ahead of the 2004–05 campaign, May re-joined Colchester United on a two-month loan deal. He impressed in a friendly match against Premier League club Charlton Athletic, scoring in a 2–2 draw, and this resulted in Phil Parkinson bringing May back to Layer Road for a second time. May started the season making four late substitute appearances as Colchester started the campaign by winning three of their four opening fixtures. He scored his first goal for Colchester in September 2004, scoring the club's third goal in a 3–1 away victory at AFC Bournemouth. May's loan deal was extended for a further month on 6 October 2004. Colchester manager Phil Parkinson stated — "We've extended the deal because he has done well and scored one or two vital goals for us. He is still developing but he has the potential to keep improving and he is an excellent lad to have around". After Colchester's 1–1 draw at Blackpool on 16 October 2004, May and Colchester teammate Craig Fagan were charged by the Football Association after "a brawl broke out late in the game following an off-the-ball incident" — with May being charged with violent conduct. May would ultimately serve a three-match suspension, and Colchester were fined £6,000 after failing to control their players. He made 15 appearances during his three-month loan spell at Colchester, scoring twice. May signed for Brentford on a one-month loan agreement in December 2004, having previously spent the 2003–04 season with the club. After playing in the club's FA Cup draw with Hinckley United, he scored in a 2–0 win over Luton Town two days later when he "touched home Kevin O'Connor's near post cross". His loan spell was subsequently extended for a further month in January 2005. His loan was again extended for another month on 5 February 2005 with Brentford manager Martin Allen "delighted" with May's development. May returned to Millwall in March 2005, having scored one goal in 16 appearances during his loan spell at Brentford. He made eight appearances for Millwall towards the latter stages of the 2004–05 season, scoring one goal, a penalty in a 4–3 home win against Crewe Alexandra on 9 April 2005.

Millwall took up the option to extend May's contract for a further year on 18 May 2005, meaning he was contracted to the club throughout the 2005–06 season. He made his first appearance of the season in Millwall's opening match of the campaign away at Leeds United on 7 August 2005, coming on as a 79th-minute substitute for Jay Simpson in a 2–1 defeat. May scored his first goal of the season on 27 August 2005, "levelling with a spectacular strike" in a 2–1 home loss against Ipswich Town. He took his 2005–06 goal tally to eleven goals when he scored twice on the final day of the season in a 4–2 defeat at Crewe Alexandra. May finished as Millwall's top goalscorer for the season with 11 goals in 44 games, although Millwall were relegated to League One as a result of finishing in 23rd place. In April 2006, May was offered a new two-year contract with the club, which he signed after speaking to new Millwall manager Nigel Spackman in May 2006.

Ahead of the 2006–07 campaign, May injured his shoulder in pre-season training, resulting in him missing the club's pre-season tour of Iceland. Spackman revealed that May's injury would rule him out of the first two months of the season. He made his first appearance of the season on 31 October 2006, coming on as a second-half substitute in Millwall's 2–0 home win against Bournemouth in the Football League Trophy, scoring Millwall's second goal with his first touch of the game. In his first start of the season, he scored after six minutes in the club's 2–1 FA Cup win against Havant & Waterlooville in a game played at Fratton Park on 13 November 2006. After Millwall's 2–0 home win against Bradford City, a game in which May assisted Filipe Morais in scoring Millwall's first goal, new Millwall manager Willie Donachie stated "There's more to come from this team, especially Darren Byfield and Ben May, who are as good as anyone in this league. They're committed, honest players who want to work for each other". May scored the only goal of the game in a 1–0 victory at Yeovil Town on 3 February 2007, converting Darren Byfield's cross to give Millwall the three points. He was substituted after 53 minutes in the same game with an ankle injury, and in March 2007, he was ruled out of first-team action for the rest of the 2006–07 season. Despite this, he made a second-half substitute appearance on the last day of the season in a 2–2 draw at Bradford City, assisting Darren Byfield's goal just after coming on. May scored four times in 19 appearances in a season disrupted by injuries.

May started the first four of Millwall's games at the start of the 2007–08 season, before scoring his first goal of the campaign in a 3–2 away loss at Swansea City in the Football League Trophy on 4 September 2007. After making a number of substitute appearances for Millwall at the start of the campaign, May joined Championship club Scunthorpe United on a three-month loan deal. He made his debut in Scunthorpe's 1–0 win at Colchester United on 29 September 2007. May made five appearances for Scunthorpe, but was recalled by Millwall on 2 November 2007 due to a number of injuries in their squad. On his return to Millwall, May played in four games for the club, scoring one goal and setting up another in a 2–1 FA Cup home win against Walsall on 15 January 2008. It was to be May's last game for the club. During his seven years at Millwall, May scored 19 goals in 95 appearances.

Scunthorpe United
May signed a two-and-a-half-year contract with Scunthorpe United on 18 January 2008, for an undisclosed fee. A day after signing for Scunthorpe, May made his debut for the club, coming on as a substitute in the 58th-minute in a 2–0 defeat against Wolverhampton Wanderers. He scored his first goal for the club in a 2–1 defeat to Ipswich Town on 22 March 2008, scoring a consolation goal in injury-time. May made 21 appearances for Scunthorpe during the second half of the 2007–08 season, of which six were starting appearances, scoring one goal. May played predominantly as a substitute during the first half of Scunthorpe's 2008–09 season, scoring his first goal of the season in a 4–0 FA Cup victory against Alfreton Town on 29 November 2008. He suffered an ankle ligament injury on 15 January 2009, ruling him out of first-team action for two months. On his return, May made four late substitute appearances, although he was not involved in Scunthorpe's successful play-off campaign as the club were promoted back to the Championship after a 3–2 victory over May's former employers, Millwall, in May 2009. May made 29 appearances during the 2008–09 season, scoring four goals.

Ahead of the club's 2009–10 campaign, May scored five second-half goals in Scunthorpe's 12–0 pre-season victory against Brigg Town. He was an unused substitute in the club's first three fixtures of the 2009–10 season, before suffering an ankle injury that ruled him out for a month. Having returned to training in October 2009, May suffered another setback after injuring his other ankle, consequently ruling him out of first-team action for six weeks. He made his first appearance of the 2009–10 season as a late substitute in a 3–1 home defeat against West Bromwich Albion on 28 December 2009. It was to be May's only appearance of the season, and he was released by Scunthorpe in May 2010. May made 51 appearances during his two and a half-year tenure at Scunthorpe, scoring five times.

Stevenage
May went on trial with League Two club Stevenage on 19 October 2010, and featured in a "behind closed doors" friendly against Dagenham & Redbridge, scoring in a 4–3 win. Shortly after, May signed for Stevenage on a permanent basis. Due to May's past history in terms of injuries, he signed a contract that was largely appearance based. Stevenage manager Graham Westley said "it's fantastic to see a player putting their football before pound notes". May made his debut for Stevenage three days after signing for the club, coming on as an 80th-minute substitute in a 0–0 draw with Morecambe. May scored his first goal for Stevenage on 7 May 2011, in the club's 3–3 draw with Bury, a result that meant Stevenage reached the play-offs in their first ever Football League season. He was injured after he scored the goal, and was substituted immediately after for Chris Beardsley. As a result, May missed Stevenage's three play-off fixtures as the club was promoted to League One following a 1–0 victory over Torquay United. May's season was disrupted by injuries, making 22 appearances for the club, of which seven were starting appearances.

Having played ten times for Stevenage in the opening six months of the 2011–12 season, May joined League Two club Barnet on loan on 10 March 2012, on an agreement until the end of the season. He made a scoring debut for the club, scoring from close range as Barnet came from a goal down to win 2–1 at Port Vale on 10 March 2012. May played regularly during his time at Barnet, making eleven appearances, as the club narrowly avoided relegation on the last day of the season. During his two-months with Barnet, he scored four times. He was released by Stevenage in May 2012.

Dover Athletic
Ahead of the 2012–13 season, May went on trial with League Two club Gillingham, training with the club for a number of weeks and playing in several pre-season friendlies. No transfer materialised, and May signed for Conference South club Dover Athletic on a free transfer on 8 August 2012. He made his competitive debut for Dover in a 2–2 away draw against Sutton United on 21 August 2012, coming on as an 86th-minute substitute. May scored his first goal for the club in a 3–1 away win at Eastleigh on 1 September2012. He went on to score in seven consecutive games running from September to November 2012, five of which in the league and a further two in the FA Cup, subsequently taking his goal tally for the season to eight. He scored four times in March 2013, meaning he had scored over 20 goals for the season, the first time May had reached this milestone in his career. Dover finished the season in third place, meaning they would play fourth placed Eastleigh in the two legged play-off semi-finals. May scored a dipping volley as Dover took a 3–1 lead in the first leg, controlling the ball on his chest with his back to goal, turning and hitting the ball from 25-yards past Ross Flitney in the Eastleigh goal. Dover progressed to the final, but lost 3–2 to Salisbury City after extra-time, with May playing in all three play-off matches. During his one season at Dover, May finished the season as the club's top goalscorer, scoring 24 times in 45 matches.

Ebbsfleet United
May signed for Conference South club Ebbsfleet United on 5 June 2013, his hometown club. On joining Ebbsfleet, May said — "It's all exciting stuff; Steve Brown showed an interest in signing me as soon as he knew he would be manager of Ebbsfleet. I'm currently enjoying a nice little break from football but I'm itching to lace my boots up and get back on the pitch". He made his Ebbsfleet debut as a substitute in the club's 1–1 draw with Eastbourne Borough on 24 August 2013. May scored his first goal for the club in a 2–1 victory against Gosport Borough on 19 October 2013, his second-half goal proved to be the winning goal of the match. He helped the club win the Kent Senior Cup during his first season as Ebbsfleet defeated May's former club, Dover Athletic, 4–0 in the final on 5 May 2014. May scored 12 times in 42 appearances during the season as Ebbsfleet lost in the Conference South play-off final to Dover Athletic five days after the two clubs had met in the Kent Senior Cup. He signed a new contract with Ebbsfleet in May 2014.

Having not made any first-team appearances during the first half of the 2014–15 season due to injury, May's contract was cancelled by mutual consent on 14 January 2015. He stated he had enjoyed his time at Ebbsfleet, with his only regret being injury restricting his game-time during his second season with the club.

Bromley
Following his departure from Ebbsfleet, May signed for fellow Conference South club Bromley on 16 January 2015, the team for which his brother, Jay, had played for the previous season. He made his Bromley debut a day after signing, coming on as a second-half substitute in a 2–1 away defeat to Whitehawk. May scored his first goal for the club in a 6–0 win at Staines Town on 7 February 2015. He made nine appearances during the second half of the season as Bromley earned promotion to the National League having won the Conference South. May remained at Bromley for the club's first year in the National League during the 2015–16 season. A back injury restricted May to 16 appearances throughout the season, scoring twice.

Coaching career
Whilst playing for Dover Athletic, May completed a diploma in personal training. May assumed the role as Bromley's strength and conditioning coach in 2016. The club finished just outside of the National League play-offs, as well as finishing as runners-up in the FA Trophy final during the 2016–17 season, with "the club being renowned for its high fitness levels and last-minute goals".

Personal life
May is good friends with England international footballer Glen Johnson, as well as Wellington Phoenix striker Gary Hooper.

In January 2007, it was reported that May and Johnson were caught at a B&Q store in Dartford, Kent, attempting to steal bathroom fittings. They both received £80 fines. Johnson described the incident as "comical" because it was a misunderstanding — "Ben was doing up his bathroom so we went to B&Q and found one of those sets where you get everything in one box. But he wanted a seat with a slow-close lid, so we took out the seat and put in another one. What we didn't know was that the new seat was £2.35 more expensive. We went through the till, paid for it and then the security guard stopped us and said he had been watching on CCTV. We just burst out laughing. Where's Jeremy Beadle then? But he said, 'No, this is serious, the police are on their way.' The police turned up and they were laughing. I said to the security guard, 'Can we not just pay the £2.35?'" He said, 'No, this is a serious offence.' So the police gave us two options: go to court and fight it out, or pay an on-the-spot fine. We couldn't be bothered going to court so we paid the fine but doing that made us look guilty".

Career statistics

A.  The "Other" column constitutes appearances and goals (including those as a substitute) in the Football League Trophy, FA Trophy, Kent Senior Cup and Conference South play-offs.

Honours
Scunthorpe United
 League One play-offs: 2008–09

Stevenage
 League Two play-offs: 2010–11

Bromley
 Conference South: 2014–15

References

External links

1984 births
Living people
Sportspeople from Gravesend, Kent
Footballers from Kent
English footballers
Association football forwards
Millwall F.C. players
Colchester United F.C. players
Brentford F.C. players
Scunthorpe United F.C. players
Stevenage F.C. players
Barnet F.C. players
Dover Athletic F.C. players
Ebbsfleet United F.C. players
Bromley F.C. players
English Football League players